is a Japanese manga written by Kenji Ichima and illustrated by Tsunehiro Date. It was serialized in Weekly Shōnen Jump from May 2020 to August 2020, and published in two volumes.

Synopsis
Up and coming manga artist Teppei Sasaki has worked resolutely to become serialized in the pages of Weekly Shounen Jump just to be dismissed over and over. When the most recent one-shot he set every one of his expectations in is dismissed, Teppei resolves that following four monotonous years, he ought to simply stop. In any case, similarly as he settles on the choice, lightning strikes his loft, intertwining his microwave and ice chest together. As he examines the wreck, the microwave wonderfully lets out a magazine: an issue of Shounen Jump from 10 years from here on out.

Frontlining this issue is another serialization named "White Knight" by Itsuki Aino, a presentation so immaculate that it moves Teppei profoundly. At the point when the issue vanishes from that point, Teppei accepts that the thought came from his own creative mind and rapidly attempts to duplicate it down as his own one-shot. Submitting it to Shounen Jump, the editors are astonished and conclude that the work is adequate to run as a series. With his fantasies at last understood, Teppei attempts to refine the one-shot and its debut before long. In the mean time, somewhere else, a 17-year-old Itsuki Aino opens the most recent issue of Shounen Jump to observe her fledgling story inside its pages, a reality that will before long come crashing downward on Teppei.

Publication
The series is written by Kenji Ichima and illustrated by Tsunehiro Date. It started serialization in Weekly Shōnen Jump on May 18, 2020. The series ended in Weekly Shōnen Jump on August 30, 2020. The first tankōbon volume was released on August 4, 2020. The second and final volume was released on October 2, 2020.

Viz Media and Manga Plus published chapters of the series simultaneously with the Japanese release.

Volume list

References

Further reading

External links
 Official website at Weekly Shōnen Jump 

Manga creation in anime and manga
Shōnen manga
Shueisha manga
Viz Media manga